The Vorous General Store is a historic general store in Fish Creek, Wisconsin. Levi Vorous built the store in 1895; it was the third store to open in Fish Creek. The Commercial Italianate building features a metal cornice with corner brackets and dentils as well as decorative cast iron fixtures, including a beam separating the building's two stories. The store stayed in the Vorous family until 1920, when Levi's widow Rachel sold it to Henry Eckert, Henry Stenzel, and Carl Seiler. In 1932, the store became Fish Creek's post office, a function which it retained until 1959; Seiler served as the first postmaster.

The store was added to the National Register of Historic Places on May 9, 1997.

References

Commercial buildings on the National Register of Historic Places in Wisconsin
Buildings and structures in Door County, Wisconsin
Commercial buildings completed in 1895
Italianate architecture in Wisconsin
National Register of Historic Places in Door County, Wisconsin
General stores in the United States